The 1992–93 First League of FR Yugoslavia was the first football season in the Federal Republic of Yugoslavia which was composed of the republics of Serbia and Montenegro, following the breakup of the SFR Yugoslavia. FK Partizan were the champions.

FK Borac Banja Luka from Banja Luka, Bosnia and Herzegovina, also participated, although they played their home matches within the territory of Serbia.

Teams

League table

Results

Winning squad
Champions: Partizan Belgrade (Coach: Ljubiša Tumbaković)

Players (league matches/league goals)
  Goran Pandurović
  Nikola Damjanac
  Vujadin Stanojković
  Nebojša Gudelj
  Slaviša Jokanović
  Gordan Petrić
  Budimir Vujačić
  Vuk Rašović
  Goran Bogdanović
  Petar Vasiljević
  Albert Nađ
  Bratislav Mijalković
  Zlatko Zahovič
  Dragan Ćirić
  Ljubomir Vorkapić
  Branko Brnović
  Slobodan Krčmarević
  Savo Milošević
  Ivan Tomić
  Slobodan Milanović
  Dejan Rađenović
  Blažo Pešikan
  Dejan Tasić
  Predrag Mijatović
Source:

Top goalscorers

References

External links 
 Table at RSSSF

Yugoslav First League seasons
Yugo
1992–93 in Yugoslav football